Aqueduct Bridge may refer to:

 Aqueduct Bridge (Clay City, Indiana), U.S.
 Aqueduct Bridge (New York City), now called High Bridge, New York, U.S.
 Aqueduct Bridge (Potomac River), between Georgetown, Washington, D.C. and Rosslyn, Virginia, U.S.

See also
 Aqueduct (bridge)